Mass media in the Philippines consists of several types of media: television, radio, newspapers, magazines, cinema, and websites.

In 2004, the Philippines had 225 television stations, 369 AM radio broadcast stations, 583 FM radio broadcast stations, 10 internet radio stations, 5 shortwave stations and 7 million newspapers in circulation.

Media outlets, such as PTV/RPN/IBC (television) and the Philippine Broadcasting Service (radio), are government-run, while most outlets are privately owned.

The most widely read newspapers are the Manila Bulletin, The Philippine Star, Philippine Daily Inquirer, Business Mirror, and BusinessWorld.

Media culture 
Much media ownership is concentrated in the hands of prominent families and businesses. Consequently, some reports tend to be one-sided presentations favoring special interests. The privately-owned press also tends toward sensationalism at times.

While the media companies are predominantly owned by moneyed and influential tycoons, the Filipino readers are given the option with the advent of the new media and this has leveled the playing field. Reputable online news publications or news portals, blog sites, and other online available resources has disrupted the readership of other giant news media companies.

Some giant media companies in the broadcasting industry have adapted also in the online news portal this include GMA Network, ABS-CBN Corporation, TV5 Network, and government owned television network PTV4. This strategy was strongly considered due to the growing number of Filipinos who use social media instead of television in watching the news through snippets or short video clips.

Due to the proliferation of disinformation and fake news, Filipino readers have turned to alternative news sources. Other alternative media outlets present in the Philippines include Tudla Productions, Southern Tagalog Exposure, Mayday Multimedia, Altermidya, and Bulatlat.

Freedom of the press 

Freedom of speech and freedom of the press are enshrined in the 1987 Constitution. According to the Constitution, under Article XVI, Section 10, the State is obligated to "provide the policy environment for … the balanced flow of information into, out of, and across the country, in accordance with a policy that respects the freedom of speech and of the press." The Constitution also guarantees freedom of the press under Article III, Section 4. The Office of the President is responsible for managing the government’s policy toward the press.

The Philippines is also a signatory to the United Nations International Covenant on Civil and Political Rights, which aims to protect freedom of expression and the freedom of the press.

Although independent observers credit the government with respecting freedom of the press in general, the government has been criticized for failing to investigate thoroughly summary killings of journalists and for subjecting journalists to harassment and surveillance. In addition to killings, journalists in the Philippines have been victims of various forms of threats and attacks, including verbal assault and intimidation, physical assault, and libel charges. Journalists have also been blacklisted from covering public events.

Violence against journalists 

The Philippines is among the most dangerous countries in the world according to various media watchdogs. The fifth annual Worldwide Press Freedom Index released by the international press freedom watchdog Reporters Without Borders (RSF) has placed the Philippines among the worst-ranked countries for 2006 at 142nd place.
It indicated the continuing murders of journalists and increased legal harassment in the form of libel suits as part of the problem in the Philippines.
Between 1986 and 2005, 52 journalists have been murdered and most of their killers go unpunished. 

The Committee to Protect Journalists ranked the Philippines among the deadliest and most dangerous places for journalists. The Philippines was also ranked as the most dangerous country in Asia for journalists in 2018 according to the Philippine Center for Media Freedom and Responsibility, which tallied 85 attacks on the media in 2018 under President Rodrigo Duterte.

Libel and cyber libel 

Libel and online libel are criminal offenses in the Philippines. Penalties for online libel include imprisonment for a maximum of 12 years and a fine of a maximum of ₱1,000,000. Since the American colonial period in the Philippines, libel laws have been used to stifle dissent. Media organizations contend that libel has been "used by people in power to harass journalists and muzzle critical reportage".

There were 37 cases of libel and oral defamation recorded from July 2016 to April 2021. Eighteen of these were online libel, while 8 of the 37 cases also led to arrests of journalists. 

There was a rise in libel and cyber libel cases in the country in 2020, according to the National Union of Journalists of the Philippines (NUJP). Rappler CEO Maria Ressa was among those convicted of cyber libel in a 2020 case involving the retroactive application of a then new cybercrime law to an article that had been published years before.

Media watchdogs have called on Congress to decriminalize libel and cyber libel, with the NUJP noting how these are "commonly used weapons against independent journalism." Makabayan lawmakers and United Nations Special Rapporteur Irene Khan have also called for the decriminalization of libel.

Red-tagging and other forms of harassment 

Journalists have been subjected to red-tagging and other forms of harassment, such as surveillance, doxing, and extortion. Red-tagging endangers journalists and makes them vulnerable to violence and to being jailed on trumped up charges, such as illegal possession of firearms. Media organizations and journalists have also been subjected to vilification and various forms of intimidation.

Government agencies, such as the National Task Force to End Local Communist Armed Conflict chaired by the President of the Philippines, have used red-tagging against journalists. From June 2016 to April 2021, there have been 51 cases of intimidation of journalists, including 30 cases of red-tagging.

The Department of Justice filed five cases in Philippine courts against Rappler, which publishes articles critical of the Philippine government. The filing of cases has been seen as part of efforts to intimidate, threaten, and ultimately shut down the website. Then-President Rodrigo Duterte also threatened to shut down over alleged tax liabilities the Philippine Daily Inquirer, which published reports critical of the Philippine government's war on drugs.

Suppression of press freedom during the Marcos dictatorship (1972-1986) 

Before the declaration of martial law in September 1972, mass media in the Philippines functioned as a government watchdog and source of information for citizens. Marcos exerted considerable effort to stifle the free press, which is considered a key feature of a functioning democracy. He shut down media outlets and set up set up print and broadcast outlets that he controlled through his cronies. In doing so, he silenced public criticism and opposition by controlling information that the people had access to. This allowed him to have the final say on what passed as truth.

By controlling the press, the dictatorship was able to suppress negative news and create an exaggerated perception of progress.

See also
List of newspapers in the Philippines
List of radio stations in the Philippines
List of television stations in the Philippines
Philippine cinema
Philippine television
Radio in the Philippines
Internet in the Philippines
Kapisanan ng mga Brodkaster ng Pilipinas

References

Further reading
 

Philippines
Philippines